SM UC-47 was a German Type UC II minelaying submarine or U-boat in the German Imperial Navy during World War I. The U-boat was ordered on 20 November 1915, laid down on 1 February 1916, and was launched on 30 August 1916. She was commissioned into the German Imperial Navy on 13 October 1916 as SM UC-47. In 13 patrols UC-47 was credited with sinking 58 ships, either by torpedo or by mines laid. UC-47 was rammed and depth charged by British patrol boat P-57, under the command of H.C. Birnie, off Flamborough Head on 18 November 1917. UC-47 went down with all hands.

Design
A German Type UC II submarine, UC-47 had a displacement of  when at the surface and  while submerged. The submarine was powered by two six-cylinder four-stroke diesel engines each producing  (a total of ), two electric motors producing , and two propeller shafts.

UC-47 was fitted with six  mine tubes, eighteen UC 200 mines, three  torpedo tubes (one on the stern and two on the bow), seven torpedoes, and one  Uk L/30 deck gun. Her complement was twenty-six crew members.

Summary of raiding history

References

Notes

Citations

Bibliography

 
 

Ships built in Bremen (state)
German Type UC II submarines
U-boats commissioned in 1916
U-boats sunk by depth charges
U-boats sunk by British warships
U-boats sunk in 1917
Maritime incidents in 1917
World War I minelayers of Germany
World War I shipwrecks in the North Sea
World War I submarines of Germany
1916 ships
Ships lost with all hands
U-boats sunk in collisions